The Solicitor-General of Barbados is a law officer of the government of Barbados, subordinate to the Attorney-General of Barbados. The office is one of the members of the government.

List of Solicitors-General of Barbados

William Savage 
John Sealy (Acting) 1839 
Robert Bowcher Clarke 1839
John Sealy 1841-1844  (then Attorney-General 1846-about 1869 )
William Conrad Reeves 1870-1876
Sir Charles Packer 1847, 1855, 1875 
Henry Alletne Bovell 1881-1885 
William Herbert Greaves 1889

References